Marsdenia tubulosa is a species of plant of unknown habit in the dogbane family.  It is endemic to Australia’s subtropical Lord Howe Island in the Tasman Sea.  It is known only from a single collection, made in 1871 on the summit of Mount Gower, and may be extinct.

Description
The plant has semi-circular leaves about 45 mm long and small tubular flowers.  The specific epithet refers to the tubular corollas.  The appearance of the fruit is unknown.

References

tubulosa
Endemic flora of Lord Howe Island
Plants described in 1875
Taxa named by Ferdinand von Mueller